Feminist political ecology is a feminist perspective on political ecology, drawing on theories from Marxism, post-structuralism, feminist geography, ecofeminism and cultural ecology. Feminist political ecology examines the place of intersectional social relations in the political ecological landscape, exploring them as a factor in ecological and political relations. Specific areas in which feminist political ecology is focused are development, landscape, resource use, agrarian reconstruction and rural-urban transformation (Hovorka 2006: 209).  Feminist political ecologists suggest gender is a crucial variable – in relation to class, race and other relevant dimensions of political ecological life – in constituting access to, control over, and knowledge of natural resources.

Feminist political ecology joins three gendered areas: knowledge, environmental rights, and environmental politics and grassroots activism. Gendered knowledge encompasses the maintenance of healthy environments at home, work, or in regional ecosystems. Gendered environmental rights include property, resources, space, and legality. Gendered environmental politics and grassroots activism emphasizes the surge in women's involvement in collective struggles over their natural resources.

Research 

The study of the relationship between environments, gender, and development has grown in importance because of the restructuring of economies, environments and cultures at a global and local level (Mitchell 2000). Women and men are being viewed as actors who affect environmental management, resource use, and the creation of policies for health and well-being. Feminist political ecology does not view gender differences in environmental impact as being biologically rooted. Rather, they are derived from social constructs of gender, which vary depending on culture, class, race, and geographical location, and they change over time between individuals and societies. A key moment on the development of the approach was the publication of Feminist Political Ecology, edited by Dianne Rocheleau et.al. at Clark University in 1996. The book showed how usage of environment and labor patterns are gendered, but also how certain environmental problems have particularly negative effects on women (Rocheleau et al. 1996). These concerns were largely absent in the better-known political ecology volume Liberation Ecologies, which was published in the same year and also developed at Clark (Peet & Watts, 1996).

In a study on the Rural Federation of Zambrana-Chacuey (a peasant federation) and an international nongovernmental organization (ENDA-Caribe) in the Dominican Republic, Dianne Rocheleau examines social forestry within the region. Women are involved in the forestry industry, but previous research (summary numbers, "regional maps of forestry-as-usual" (Rocheleau 1995: 460) had not represented the "different publics (differentiated by gender, class, locality, and occupation) within the Federation (p460)". Rocheleau's study draws upon post-structuralism to "expand our respective partial and situated knowledges through a politics a science that go beyond identity to affinities then work from affinities to coalitions" (p459).In other words, the study does not assume that the identity of a person defines them, but instead focuses on "affinities" (defined as "based on affiliations, and shared views of interests, subject to change over time"). The purpose of this was to "address women within the context in which they had organized and affiliated themselves (p461)". The purpose of the study was to include women in the general study of the area in a way that gave justice to the "ecological and social contexts that sustain their lives" (p461), instead of separating them from the context, rendering them invisible.

In a Botswana study on urban poultry agriculture, Alice J. Hovorka (2006) examines the implications of fast-paced urbanization on social and ecological relations in a feminist political ecology framework. Men and women are both involved and affected by development issues, so therefore "gender is an integral part of a key element of agrarian change and rural-urban transformation" (Hovorka 2006:209). Before urbanization took off, socially constructed gender roles played a huge part in gendered experiences of the landscape. Gender determined the different roles, responsibilities and access to resources. It is important to note that although Botswana women gained the right to vote in 1966, they remain excluded from political power. Gender issues are rarely raised in this country where "powerful conventions restrict women's domain to the household and women's autonomy under male guardianship" (p211). With urbanization, land use is becoming more accessible to Botswana women. But studies have revealed that "women's access to social status and productive resources remains limited compared to men's" (p213). Traditional gender roles affect women's economic situation, their access to resources and land, their education, and their labor market.

Alice Beban expands on these concepts in her research on land tenure in Cambodia, which applies a gender lens. Her study is related to the Cambodian Constitution and Land Law of 2001 which increased private land ownership under land titles. This means that those land owners without formal titles lack land rights and risk loss of land. Women are more vulnerable to insecurity in this situation. Men are more likely to be land owners and if women are in abusive relationships they have limited choices as men own the land they rely on. Similar to the Botswana case, women have less political power in this situation.

In 2009 Feminist Political Ecology took a new analytical turn with the publication of Eco-Sufficiency & Global Justice: Women write Political Ecology edited by Ariel Salleh. See analysis by Bonnie Kime Scott, 'Righting the Neoliberal Ecology Debt' in the Australian Women's Book Review volume 22.1 (2010).

Quotes on feminist political ecology 

 New research in feminist political ecology moves "from a focus on women's vulnerabilities and the silencing of gendered and subaltern knowledges to stress the global significance of women's embodied practices, emerging social movements, and collaborative action". —Stephanie Buechler and Anne-Marie Hanson (2015)
 "Feminist Political Ecology aims at analyzing gendered experiences of and responses to environmental and political-economic change that brings with it changing livelihoods, landscapes, property regimes, and social relations." —Alice Hovorka (2006)
 "Rather than 'adding women' to standard methods of empirical research it was possible to include gender as a subject of study, to incorporate feminist post-structuralist perspective into the research design, and to apply it to an analysis of social and environmental change within the region." —Dianne Rocheleau 1995.
 "My first feminist paper was published, out of research I did in the late 1970s on sex difference in migration and social change in rural Puerto Rico. It had to do with how rural industrialization, reflecting US development policies, was affecting who stayed and who left. And how class and gender intersected with migration patterns in rural Puerto Rico." —Jan Monk

Practical examples 

 Feminist political ecology includes the study of how water access and gender are related, particularly in developing countries. Gender mainstreaming encourages the convergence of women's issues and gender equality with natural resource protection and development projects. Feminist political ecology seeks to question and inform understanding regarding how gender, and other social labels and classifiers, influence how people relate to and interact with the natural environment, including how people have access to water.

See also

References

 Beban, A. 2021. Unwritten Rule: State-Making through Land Reform in Cambodia. Cornwell University Press.
Buechler, S. and A. Hanson.  2015. A Political Ecology of Women, Water and Global Environmental Change.  Routledge.
 Elmhirst, R. 2011. Introducing New Feminist Political Ecologies. Geoforum 42(2):129-132 (special issue)
 Hovorka, A. 2006. The No. 1 Ladies' Poultry Farm: A Feminist Political Ecology of Urban Agriculture in Botswana. Gender, Place and Culture 13(3): 207–255.
 Merchant, C. 1980. The Death of Nature: Women, Ecology and the Scientific Revolution. New York: HarperCollins.
 Mitchell, Don. 2000. Cultural Geography. Blackwell.
 Peet, R. and M.J. Watts (eds.). 1996. Liberation Ecologies. London and New York: Routledge.
 Plumwood, V. 1993. Feminism and the Mastery of Nature. London: Routledge.
 Plumwood, V. 2003. Environmental Culture: The Ecological Crisis of Reason. London: Routledge.
 Rocheleau, D. 1995. Maps, Numbers, Text and Context: Mixing Methods in Feminist Political Ecology. Professional Geographer 47(4):458-467.
 Rocheleau D., B. Thomas-Slayter and E. Wangari (eds). 1996. Feminist Political Ecology: Global Issues and Local Experiences.  London and New York: Routledge.
 Salleh, A. 2009. Eco-Sufficiency & Global Justice: Women write Political Ecology. London: Pluto Press.
 Salleh, A. 2017. "Ecofeminism" in Clive Spash (ed). Routledge Handbook of Ecological Economics. London: Routledge.
 Shiva, V. 1989. Staying Alive: Women, Ecology and Development. London: Zed Books.
 Richardson, Douglas, Noel Castree, Michael F. Goodchild, Audrey Lynn Kobayashi, Weidong Liu, and Richard A. Marston. The international encyclopedia of geography: people, the earth, environment, and technology. Chichester, UK: John Wiley & Sons, 2017.

Feminist theory
Feminism and education
Feminism and social class
Feminism and health
Political ecology
Human geography